Slate Hill is an unincorporated community in Buckingham County, in the U.S. state of Virginia.

References

Unincorporated communities in Virginia
Unincorporated communities in Buckingham County, Virginia